Kelsey Bing (born October 1, 1997) is an American field hockey player.

Personal life
Kelsey Bing was born and raised in Houston, Texas. She started playing hockey in middle school.

Bing is a former student-athlete at Stanford University. Bing was named to the U.S Women's National Team following a successful career on the junior national team.

Career

Junior National Team
In 2013, Bing was first named in a junior national team. She represented the United States Under 18 side at a qualifier for the 2014 Youth Olympic Games in Montevideo, Uruguay. The team won a bronze medal.

Bing represented the United States Under 21 side at the 2016 Pan-Am Junior Championship, a qualifier for the Junior World Cup. The team qualified for the 2016 Junior World Cup, where Bing was also a member of the squad.

Senior National Team
Bing made her senior international debut in 2018 in a test series against Belgium.

Since her debut, Bing has been a regular inclusion in the United States team, most recently playing in the 2019 FIH Pro League.

References

Living people
1997 births
American female field hockey players
Sportspeople from Houston
Pan American Games bronze medalists for the United States
Pan American Games medalists in field hockey
Field hockey players at the 2019 Pan American Games
Medalists at the 2019 Pan American Games
21st-century American women